Paschall Davis (born June 5, 1969) is a former American football linebacker. He played for the Sacramento Gold Miners in 1993, the Shreveport Pirates in 1994 and for the St. Louis Rams from 1995 to 1996.

References

1969 births
Living people
American football linebackers
Texas A&M–Kingsville Javelinas football players
Sacramento Gold Miners players
Shreveport Pirates players
St. Louis Rams players
Amsterdam Admirals players